The Assab volcanic field is a group of basaltic cinder cones and associated lava flows located in the Southern Red Sea region of Eritrea.

See also
List of volcanoes in Eritrea

References

Mountains of Eritrea
Volcanoes of Eritrea
Volcanic fields